Lithasia is a genus of medium-sized freshwater snails, aquatic gilled gastropod molluscs in the family Pleuroceridae. This genus is endemic to rivers in the mid-southern United States.

Species
Species within the genus Lithasia include:
 Armigerous river snail (Lithasia armigera)
 Knobby rocksnail (Lithasia curta)
 Dutton's river snail (Lithasia duttoniana)
 Geniculate river snail (Lithasia geniculata)
 Jay's river snail (Lithasia jayana)
 Elk River file snail (Lithasia lima)
 Muddy rocksnail (Lithasia salebrosa)
 Varicose rocksnail (Lithasia verrucosa)

References

 Nomenclator Zoologicus info

Pleuroceridae
Taxa named by Samuel Stehman Haldeman
Taxonomy articles created by Polbot